Juan de Ávalos y García-Taborda (October 21, 1911 in Mérida – July 7, 2006 in Madrid) was a Spanish sculptor.

Juan de Ávalos began his training very early. As a six-year-old he was a student of D. Juan Carmona, pastor of the Church of Santa Eulalia, who taught him and three other children to draw. de Ávalos's family moved to Madrid shortly after that, as his father's eyesight deteriorated. In Madrid, de Ávalos's father showed his son's drawings to the painter Manuel Benedito. The famous artist was surprised to see the quality of work of a child. He didn't believe a child could draw so well until he went to de Ávalos at work. Convinced of the boy's talent, he advised de Ávalos's father to take his son to the Casón del Buen Retiro.

Author of Los amantes de Teruel (The Lovers of Teruel) in Teruel, Monumento a Luis Carrero Blanco (Monument to Luis Carrero Blanco) in Santoña, Cantabria, his most important works are those of the Valle de los Caídos ("The Valley of the  Fallen"), a majestic monument in Madrid where Francisco Franco's body once lay.

He married in 1937 María de la Soledad Carballo y Núñez and had two sons, Juan and Luis de Ávalos y Carballo. Ávalos died in Clínica Virgen del Mar, in Madrid.

Main works
El Héroe Caído, Badajoz, 1950-1956
Marinos caídos en el Mediterráneo, Benidorm, 1963
 Ángel de la Victoria y de la Paz, Valdepeñas, 1964
Cristo de la Paz, Almendralejo, 1965
Monument to Franco, Santa Cruz de Tenerife (1966).
Arco del Triunfo a la Independencia in Dominican Republic
Los Monteros (or Monument to Covarsí), Badajoz, 1968
Genio de Extremadura
La Ciudad y el Río
Bernardo de Gálvez, Washington, D.C., 1976
Extremeños Universales, Badajoz, 1983
Monument to Count Diego Porcelos, Burgos, 1983
Pope John Paul II, Madrid, 1998

References

1911 births
2006 deaths
Artists from Extremadura
20th-century Spanish sculptors
20th-century Spanish male artists
Spanish male sculptors